Juliana Hatfield Sings The Police is a covers album by American alternative rock artist Juliana Hatfield, covering British rock band The Police. The album has been positively received by critics.

Recording and release
Released in 2019, the collection follows 2018's Juliana Hatfield Sings Olivia Newton-John and was originally begun as a Phil Collins covers album. The Police had been a childhood favorite of Hatfield's and she chose to balance the group's biggest hits with more obscure songs. Hatfield announced the album on August 1, 2019, and previewed the album with her recording of "De Do Do Do, De Da Da Da". "Next to You" was released on September 25 to promote the album.

Critical reception
 A positive review from Pastes Andy Crump summed up the release as "an act of pop cultural interrogation for its own sake", praising it as a covers album that successful recontextualizes The Police's work as well as a good album on its own merit. The editorial staff of AllMusic Guide gave the album 4.5 out of five stars, with reviewer Stephen Thomas Erlewine praised the musical variety on the album and Hatfield's innovative take on the songs, calling the release, "fresh and alive, once again feeling like punk-inspired pop". In Under the Radar, Frank Valish wrote that Hatfield "one of the rarest of artists who is able to both revere and transcend the original compositions" and gave the album eight out of 10. Chris Ingalls of PopMatters also gave the album eight out of 10 and particularly called out the variety of musicianship, summing up, "As she has demonstrated with this album as well as the Olivia Newton-John project, she's a musician who is dedicated to paying tribute to the music of her youth and finding new and interesting ways to present it". A muted review from American Songwriters Hal Horowitz gave the release three out of five stars, writing, "This is a fun listen but also feels like a way for Hatfield to amuse herself, romping through a dozen interesting, far from essential interpretations of the Police’s music in 45 minutes as she works on new material". Pablo Gorondi of AP News praised Hatfield's ability to choose a balance of songs and perform them with variety, calling future covers projects "a most welcome prospect".

Track listing
All songs written by Sting, except where noted
"Can't Stand Losing You" – 3:09
"Canary in a Coalmine" – 2:49
"Next to You" – 3:59
"Hungry for You (J'aurais Toujours Faim De Toi)" – 3:14
"Roxanne" – 3:45
"Every Breath You Take" – 4:34
"Hole in My Life" – 4:24
"De Do Do Do, De Da Da Da" – 4:15
"Murder by Numbers" (Sting, Andy Summers) – 2:33
"Landlord" (Stewart Copeland, Sting) – 3:21
"Rehumanize Yourself" (Copeland, Sting) – 3:27
"It's Alright for You" (Copeland, Sting) – 3:39

Personnel
Juliana Hatfield – vocals, guitar, bass guitar (except where noted below), drums (except where noted below), keyboards, production, mixing

Additional personnel
Chris Anzalone – drums on "Hole in My Life", "Murder by Numbers", "Landlord", "Rehumanize Yourself", and "It's Alright" for You"
James Bridges – engineering, mixing, machine drum on "Roxanne"
Daykamp Creative, Nicole Anguish – design, illustration
Patrick DiCenso – mastering
Ed Valauskas – bass guitar on "Canary in a Coalmine", "Hole in My Life", "Landlord", "Rehumanize Yourself", and "It's Alright for You"

References

External links
Page from American Laundromat Records

2019 albums
American Laundromat Records albums
Juliana Hatfield albums
The Police tribute albums